is an action-adventure video game developed and published by Sega for the PlayStation 3. It is a jidaigeki-themed spin-off game in the Like a Dragon series. It was unveiled at the Tokyo Game Show 2007 and released in 2008.

A second Like a Dragon series spin-off set in samurai era, Ryū ga Gotoku Ishin!, was released in 2014 on both the PlayStation 3 and the PlayStation 4 systems. Ishin! is set two centuries later than Kenzan!, hence the plots are not related to each other since both games focus on different characters, the historical figures of Sakamoto Ryōma (1836–1867) and Miyamoto Musashi (1584–1645) respectively.

Development
After successfully releasing the first two games on the PlayStation 2, the team initially made fun of their goal of making the next game for the then-new PlayStation 3, while also moving to a different setting. However, they managed to make it in just a year and a bit, and the staff felt refreshed.

Gameplay

Adventure
The gameplay shows minimal evolution from the first two episodes except for the new item storage system which allows access to an unlimited number of items from savepoints.

Battle
There are four fighting styles in the game; fists, one blade, two blades and two-handed blades. There are also QTE-based special moves that the player can execute, known as 'heat action'.

Plot

Setting
This spin-off is set in Kyoto during the Edo period, in 1605. It is an account of the life of Miyamoto Musashi. The main adventure is completed with sidestories including minigames and a hundred "sub-stories".

Story

Five years after the battle, a little girl named Haruka comes to Gion seeking a local hitman known as Kazumanosuke Kiryu which is actually Miyamoto's new identity. After eventually finding Kiryū, Haruka asks for him to assassinate an impostor pretending to be Miyamoto Musashi. At first, Kiryu refuses, then when the girl goes as far as becoming an indentured servant in an opulent oiran brothel in order to pay the assassination mission he accepts the one-ryō request.

Characters

This is the first game in the series where the games' main characters have their face modeled in 3D after their voice actors who are Japanese celebrities. Cyberware's color 3D scanner (model PS) was used to analyze each actor's head & face in order to collect data on its shape and appearance, then this file was worked with the Softimage XSI 3D graphics application.

Takaya Kuroda as Kazumanosuke Kiryu (桐生 一馬之介) / Miyamoto Musashi (宮本 武蔵)
Shota Matsuda as Sasaki Kojirō (佐々木 小次郎)
Susumu Terajima as Itō Ittōsai (伊東 一刀斎)
Masaya Kato as Seijuro Yoshioka (吉岡 清十郎)
Takashi Tsukamoto as Gion Tōji (祗園 藤次)
Hiroki Matsukata as Mysterious Monk (謎の僧)
Naoto Takenaka as Marume Nagayoshi (丸目 長恵)
Aya Hisakawa as Yoshino Tayū (吉野 太夫)
Rie Kugimiya as Haruka (遥)
Yinling of Joytoy as Libido Waterfall (滝の煩悩)

Releases

Trial versions
Two playable demos were released on January 7, 2008 via the Japanese PlayStation Store.  The first demo included sandbox play, and the second had a collection of  various combat and romantic gameplay segments.

As part of the pre-ordering campaign, the Japanese first print was bundled with a limited item, a monography called Kamutai Magazine (March 2008 issue). Sony celebrated the Japanese release of the game with a 10,000 pieces limited edition Satin Silver 40GB model  SKU including a  stickers set to customize the console case.

Asian and western markets
The Japanese version was released on March 6, 2008 in both Japan and South East Asia, while Sony published it in South Korea on March 25, 2008 with a subtitled script book.

In late December 2009, commenting the opportunity of a western release, Sega Australia managing director Darren Macbeth said "there is nothing in the plan at this stage for Yakuza Kenzan. Right now we are focusing on the release of Yakuza 3. The feedback we get from this release will help us in making future decisions". In March 2010, Yakuza 3 had a western release as did in 2011 Yakuza 4. Then again, in 2012, a second spinoff was also released abroad and localized as Yakuza: Dead Souls.

In 2019, then-producer of the series, Daisuke Sato, commented that due to its age as an early PS3 game, releasing a simple HD remaster as with Yakuza 3-5 (which were re-released as The Yakuza Remastered Collection) would make players today feel like something is missing, and as a result, Kenzan! is suitable for a remake similar to Yakuza Kiwami and Yakuza Kiwami 2.

Though a Western release has yet to happen, the Western release of Like a Dragon: Ishin! in 2023 (originally released in Japan in 2014) has led to an increased possibility for a Western release of Kenzan!.

Soundtrack
The Ryu Ga Gotoku Kenzan! Original Sound Track (HCV-381) album was published by Wave Master in Japan on March 6, 2008. The music was composed by Hidenori Shoji, Hideki Sakamoto, Hiroyoshi Kato, Keisuke Ito and Yuri Fukuda, with additional cutscene music by Hideki Naganuma.

The game also features two songs by Japanese hip hop artists Zeebra and Ketsumeishi; Zeebra collaborated later with the Yakuza 4 opening theme, "Butterfly City".  
opening theme: Bushido by Zeebra. Released in Japan by Pony Canyon (PCCA-02642) as a dual-disc single on March 5, 2008. First disc is a CD including the title track and an instrumental version plus a B-side Lyrical Gunman (Three Gunz Up Remix) featuring Rudebwoy Face and Chappa Ranks. Second disc is a bonus DVD with the music video for Bushido which includes cutscene footages from the game.
closing theme:  by Ketsumeishi from their 2007 album Ketsupolis 5 published in Japan by Toy's Factory.

Marketing

Licensed products
Clothes manufacturer Cropped Heads collaborated with Sega to produce licensed Ryu Ga Gotoku Kenzan! tee-shirts, and Ace Cook produced Ryu Ga Gotoku Kenzan! cup noodles.

Reception
Within four days of its release in Japan, the game sold 181,189 copies, topping the Media Create sales chart for its release week. It remained in the top 10 for its second week, selling a further 45,776 copies, for a total of about 227,000 copies. As of July 9, 2008, it went on to sell 270,438 copies, according to Famitsu. As a best seller in Japan, the game received a budget re-release under the PlayStation 3 the Best bargain collection on December 11, 2008.

It earned the Award for Excellence at the Japan Game Awards 2008, and the Japanese video game magazine Famitsu reviewed it 37/40.

Notes

References

External links
 Official website

2008 video games
Action-adventure games
Hack and slash games
Japan-exclusive video games
PlayStation 3-only games
Sega beat 'em ups
Sega video games
Video game prequels
Video games set in feudal Japan
Ryū ga Gotoku Kenzan!
PlayStation 3 games
Open-world video games
Single-player video games
Video games scored by Hideki Sakamoto
Video game spin-offs
Video games scored by Hidenori Shoji
Video games developed in Japan